In the context of the Internet addressing structure, an address pool is a set of Internet Protocol addresses available at any level in the IP address allocation hierarchy. At the top level, the IP address pool is managed by the Internet Assigned Numbers Authority (IANA). The total IPv4 address pool contains  (232) addresses, while the size of the IPv6 address pool is 2128 addresses.

In the context of application design, an address pool may be the availability of a set of addresses (IP address, MAC address) available to an application that is shared among its users, or available for allocation to users, such as in host configurations with the Dynamic Host Configuration Protocol (DHCP).

See also
 Dynamic Host Configuration Protocol
 IPv4 address exhaustion
 List of assigned /8 IPv4 address blocks

References

Internet architecture